Ricardo Cousins (born 10 August 1987) is a Jamaican footballer, who currently plays for Humble Lions FC.

Youth career

Ricardo Cousins came up through the youth system of Sporting Central Academy and Glenmiur High School in Clarendon, Jamaica.

Club career

In 2008, he led Portmore United F.C to the Jamaica National Premier League title.  For 2010/2011 season, Cousins has once again stabilized the central midfield for Portmore United. In 2012 Cousins captained Portmore United to the Red Stripe Premiere League title. In 2013, he has joined Bangladesh Premier League (football) club Sheikh Russel KC.

International career 

In 2007, he led Jamaica U20 national team to the 2007 Pan Am Games Finals.  In 2008, Cousins made his senior international debut against Trinidad and Tobago after impressing then Technical Director, Rene Simoes.  Cousins earned a national team recall in April 2010 for a match versus South Africa.

Honours

Portmore United 
 Winner (2): 2008, 2012 Jamaica National Premier League
 Winner (1): 2007 JFF Champions Cup

Jamaica 
 Runner-up(1): 2007 Pan Am Games

References 

1987 births
Living people
Footballers at the 2007 Pan American Games
Jamaica international footballers
Jamaican footballers
Association football midfielders
Portmore United F.C. players
Pan American Games competitors for Jamaica
Sporting Central Academy players
Sheikh Russel KC players
National Premier League players
Pan American Games silver medalists for Jamaica
Pan American Games medalists in football
Medalists at the 2007 Pan American Games